is a Japanese film director.

Filmography

References

External links

1968 births
Living people
Japanese film directors
Place of birth missing (living people)
Fantasy film directors